Jack Gunner Heron (born 8 November 1948 in Salisbury - now Harare) is a former Zimbabwean cricketer. He played all his six One Day Internationals (ODIs) for Zimbabwe in the 1983 Cricket World Cup.

Heron played one of the slowest innings in ODI history when he scored 12 off 73 balls against the West Indies at New Road, Worcester on 13 June 1983.

References

1948 births
Living people
Cricketers from Harare
White Zimbabwean sportspeople
Rhodesia cricketers
Zimbabwe One Day International cricketers
Zimbabwean cricketers
Cricketers at the 1983 Cricket World Cup
Lincolnshire cricketers